Kabul school bombing  may refer to:

 2021 Kabul school bombing
 April 2022 Kabul school bombing
 September 2022 Kabul school bombing